Osipovsky is a rural locality (a khutor) in Krasnyaynskoye Rural Settlement, Uryupinsky District, Volgograd Oblast, Russia. The population was 28 as of 2010. There are 4 streets.

Geography 
Osipovsky is located 22 km northeast of Uryupinsk (the district's administrative centre) by road. Serkovsky is the nearest rural locality.

References 

Rural localities in Uryupinsky District